Frederick Henry may refer to:

 Frederick Henry, Prince of Orange (1584–1647), Prince of Orange and stadtholder of Holland, Zeeland, Utrecht, Guelders, and Overijssel
 Frederick Henry, Duke of Saxe-Zeitz-Pegau-Neustadt (1668–1713), German prince of the House of Wettin
 Frederick Henry, Margrave of Brandenburg-Schwedt (1709–1788), last owner of the Prussian secundogeniture of Brandenburg-Schwedt
 Frederick Henry (cyclist) (born 1929), Canadian Olympic cyclist
 Frederick Henry (bishop) (born 1943), Roman Catholic bishop in Calgary, Canada
 F. C. Henry (Frederick Charles Henry), British trade unionist and political activist
 Frederick F. Henry (1919–1950), Medal of Honor recipient
 Snake Henry (1895–1987), American baseball player and manager, born Frederick Marshall Henry

See also
 Frederick Henry Bay, in Tasmania